The Zhuhai tram network was a light rail system serving the city of Zhuhai, Guangdong, China. The first section of Line 1 started trial operation on November 7, 2014 with the full line scheduled initially to open by August 2015 and finally opened on 13 June 2017 and runs from Haitian Gardens to Shangchong. A three-line network was planned.

Line 1 uses AnsaldoBreda's Sirio trams, license built at CRRC Dalian and was also the first Chinese tram system that uses Ansaldo's catenary-free TramWave electrification system. When complete, it will connect central Zhuhai to Zhuhai Railway Station and the Gongbei Port of Entry to Macau.

It has suspended service since January 22, 2021 due to low ridership and high operating costs. It is reported that the tram will be dismantled. On May 31, the tram committee voted 15 to 1 to demolish the tram line, due to low operational reliability, high operational cost, lack of services and low passenger levels. The TramWave technology was especially problematic and despite 11 different modifications to the power supply, it has remained problematic, with accidents related to the power supply system happening on average 0.13 times for every thousand kilometre travelled by all trams combined, and has risen higher every year, with a failure rate of 0.05 in 2017. The power supply was especially vulnerable to rainwater, causing short circuits and electricity leakage.

References 

Zhuhai
Zhuhai
Rail transport in Guangdong